Garibaldi / Lagunilla (formerly Garibaldi) is a station on the Mexico City Metro. It is a transfer station, serving both Lines 8 and B. It is the northern terminus of Line 8.

Name and pictogram
The station's logo depicts a guitar and a sarape. Plaza Garibaldi is a large square near the metro station which was named in honor of Giuseppe Garibaldi II, the grandson of Italian hero Giuseppe Garibaldi. The square is famous for the many groups of Mariachi musicians who gather there and for the large numbers of visitors who come to eat, drink, and listen to music in the nearby cantinas.

General information
Garibaldi is located on the northern fringes of Mexico City's historical downtown district or Centro, it also serves Colonia Guerrero, and Colonia Morelos.

Garibaldi's Line 8 platform first opened to passengers in July 1994 and the Line B connection started in December 1999.

In May 2017 a permanent exposition about Mexican boxing idols was inaugurated in the station. This included murals and photographies of prominent Mexican boxers such as Raúl Macías, Julio César Chávez, Mariana Juárez, Marco Antonio Barrera, Pipino Cuevas and Saúl Álvarez.

Ridership

Gallery

References

External links 
 

Garibaldi Lagunilla
Railway stations opened in 1994
1994 establishments in Mexico
Railway stations opened in 1999
1999 establishments in Mexico
Mexico City Metro Line B stations
Mexico City Metro stations in Cuauhtémoc, Mexico City
Accessible Mexico City Metro stations
Paseo de la Reforma